Major Andrew Hunter Holmes (1782August 14, 1814) born in Fairfax County, Virginia, was an American army officer. He was Captain of the 24th Infantry in the War of 1812 and was promoted to major June 8, 1813. On April 18, 1814, he was Major of the 32nd Infantry.  He was victorious at the Battle of Longwoods in Upper Canada but was killed August 4, 1814, in an attack on Fort Mackinac, Michigan, in the Battle of Mackinac Island.  Holmes County, Ohio, and Holmesville, Mississippi, are named for him.

References

1782 births
1814 deaths
American military personnel killed in the War of 1812
United States Army officers
People from Fairfax County, Virginia
Burials in Michigan